Bakrani (Sindhi: باڪراڻي) is a town in Larkana District, Sindh province of Pakistan. This town is situated at a distance of 11  km south of Larkana city and a distance of 17km north of Mohan-Jo-Daro on the Larkana–Mohenjo-daro road. It has an altitude of 53 meters  and is the headquarters of Bakrani Taluka. Bakrani was the taluka headquarters of Lab-e-Daryah taluka. More than 70% of peoples are farming and the main income source of the people of the area is agriculture, Dadu canal is the main source of irrigation in the area. Currently (2022-23) Assistant Comissioner is Mohsan Raza Dashti(PMS) Officer.  

There are girls and boys primary and high schools in the town. There is a basic health unit to provide health facilities to the people of the town. There is a PTCL exchange that provides telephone connections to Bakrani and also neighboring villages. There are the main bazaar and a vegetable market in the center of the town. There is also a rice mill and ice factory in the town.

Bakrani is an education center for surrounding villages 1st government high school established in Bakrani after Dokri and Badah town. 
1st  private educational institute established in Bakrani in 1998 founded by Nizam Ali Ali Nawaz Memon, famous as Soorih Sindhi (Social worker and nationalist) with the name of Sindh Public School Bakrani for quality English / Sindhi medium education.

Communication:  
Bakrani - Madd Fridabad link road, Bakrani - Kunbi Sandila link road, Bakrani - Pathan link road, Bakrani - Hatri Ghulam Shah Link road, Bakrani - Gerelo link road, Bakrani - Syed Ghulam Shah Link Road connecting to Bakrani with many others surrounding villages Bakrani is the Business hub and center of surrounding villages. 

Kalhoro caste is the largest here and others are Memon, Tunio, Brohi, Shaikh, Syed, Soorma, Daya, Kunbhar, Pirzada, Chana, Lohar, Meo Rajpoots, and Unar.

Maternal home town (Thullah) of Fahad Mustafa the famous actor, celebrity, host of Pakistan's No.1 game show "Jeeto pakistan".  

Politicians, Famous personalities, and Social workers:
There are many personalities born from the soul of Baqrani such as; Faqeer Gul Hassan Khero (Bekhood Faqeer) a Sufi poet, his shrine is in village Mehrab Kalhoro, Haji Ghulam Hussain Unar Ex MPA, Haji Altaf Hussain Unar Ex-Minister of Sindh, Allah Bux Unar, Shafqat Hussain Unar, Syed Quwat Ali Shah Bukhari, Abdul Gafoor Abbasi, Aftab Ahmed Abbasi (Politicians), Nizam Ali Memon / Soorih Sindhi (Nationalist, Social worker, Writer, Editor & Publisher Monthly Jakhor - a Sindhi literary magazine 1991-96), Comrade Arbab Ali Khero (social worker and nationalist), Shahzado Khan Shaikh (Ex-Chief Secretary of Sindh)

References

Larkana District